Julie Kenner is a USA Today bestselling American author of romance and fantasy novels.  She also writes with the pen names J.K. Beck and J. Kenner. In 2014, she received the Romance Writers of America RITA Award as J. Kenner for Best Erotic Romance for Claim Me.

Biography

Originally from California, Kenner grew up in Texas and received a bachelor's degree in radio-television-film from the University of Texas at Austin and later attended law school at Baylor University School of Law in Waco, Texas. After practicing law in Los Angeles, California she quit and moved to Austin, Texas and continued practicing. For five years Kenner practiced law and wrote novels, in 2004 she gave up practicing law to become a full-time writer and mother.

She has written a number of books, including the four-part Aphrodite series, and her 2005 novel Carpe Demon. The movie rights for Carpe Demon have been optioned by 1492 Pictures and Warner Brothers in a multi-book deal.

Bibliography

As Julie Kenner

Codebreaker trilogy

The Dark Pleasures Series (novellas)
 Caress of Darkness (stand alone, Rainer & Callie)
 Find Me in Darkness (#1, Mal and Christina)
 Find Me in Pleasure (#2, Mal and Christina)
 Find Me in Passion (#3, Mal and Christina)
 Caress of Pleasure (stand alone, Dante's story)

Superhero series 

 
 
 
 

  (series prologue)
  (novella, falls between Kiss and Passion)

Blood Lily Chronicles

Demon-Hunting Soccer Mom series

 
 
 
 
  (short story)

Anthologies

Kenner has also had her works appear in a number of anthologies.

 
   With Stephanie Bond's Manhunting in Mississippi
 
 
 
  With Dee Davis and Kathleen O'Reilly
  With Dee Davis and Kathleen O'Reilly

As J. Kenner

The Stark Series - Original Trilogy

Stark Ever After (Nikki & Damien novellas)
 Take Me (digital novella) (December 2013)
 Have Me (November 2014)
 Play My Game (February 2015)

Stark International Novels - Sylvia & Jackson Trilogy
 Say My Name (April 2015)
 On My Knees (June 2015)
 Under My Skin (September 2015)

Stark International Novellas - Jamie & Ryan
 Tame Me (March 2014)

Most Wanted Series
 Wanted (January 2014)
 Heated (June 2014)
 Ignited (September 2014)
Dirtiest

 Dirtiest (April 2016)
 Hottest Mess (July 2016)
 Sweetest Taboo (October 2016)

As J.K. Beck

Shadow Keeper Series
 When Blood Calls (August 2010)
 When Pleasure Rules (September 2010)
 When Wicked Craves (October 2010)
 Midnight (e-novella) (November 2011)
 When Passion Lies (May 2012)
 When Darkness Hungers (June 2012)
 When Temptation Burns (July 2012)

Awards and reception

 2014 - Romance Writers of America RITA Award for Best Erotic Romance as J. Kenner for Claim Me

Kenner has also won a number of awards.  She was certified as a USA Today bestselling author and won the Romantic Times Reviewers' Choice Award for Best Contemporary Paranormal Fiction for her book Aphrodite's Kiss, received two PEARL Award honorable mentions, including Best New Author, and her book The Cat's Fancy won the Venus Award for Best Paranormal Fiction of the Year, the Romance Journal's Francis Award, and was a Sapphire Award Finalist.

References

External links
 

American women novelists
American romantic fiction writers
Baylor University alumni
Living people
Texas lawyers
Moody College of Communication alumni
Year of birth missing (living people)
American fantasy writers
20th-century American novelists
21st-century American novelists
Women science fiction and fantasy writers
Women romantic fiction writers
20th-century American women writers
21st-century American women writers
RITA Award winners
People from Mountain View, California
Novelists from California